Silot Lagoon (more widely and erroneously known as Silot Bay) is a shallow body of water located in the municipality of Liloan, Cebu in the Philippines. It is a lagoon surrounded by mangroves that is connected to the Camotes Sea by a narrow channel called the Liloan River. It is bounded to the east by the village of Catarman, to the west by Yati, and to the south by Tayud. It has sandbars near its outlet at Liloan River.

Geography

Its waters flows to the Camotes Sea through a short channel known as the Liloan River. The waters in the river's mouth is prone to swirling current. It separates two of the town's barangays which are connected through a bridge. The name of Liloan town, reportedly came from the lagoon's current; from lilo or the Cebuano word for whirlpool.

In 2000, the Department of Environment and Natural Resources' (DENR) Environmental Management Bureau gave Silot Lagoon an "SB" classification, which meant that the lagoon host "fishery water suitable for commercial propagation of shellfish and intended as spawning areas for milkfish and similar species"

Use

The lagoon is traditional fishing grounds for tilapia, groupers (Lapu-Lapu) and shrimps. It is also frequented by bathers. Several resorts can be found along Silot Lagoon's coastline; including Silot Beach Resort, commonly known as Pilapil Park, and Papa Kit's Marina and Fishing Lagoon. The latter is owned by Democrito Mendoza.

Property dispute
The  property of trade union leader Democrito Mendoza in Silot Lagoon has been a subject of a local dispute. Mendoza's first commercial involvement in the Silot Lagoon was in 1954 when he secured a fishpond permit. Taking advantage of President Ferdinand Marcos's order to the Bureau of Forestry to release all fish pond areas to the Bureau of Lands as "alienable and disposable" in 1967, he was able to acquire a property in the lagoon in 1974 with then-Liloan Mayor Cesar Bugtai opposing his bid. The Department of Environment and Natural Resources in 1990 attempted to retrieve Mendoza's property for the government through legal means but the Supreme Court ruled in 2007 in favor of Mendoza.

In 2014, Mendoza erected fencing around his property in the lagoon which local fishers complained that this has bared them access from the lagoon's fishing grounds and alleged that the fencing was made in preparation of developing the enclosed property into a water park. The structure was shortly demolished following protests.

References

Lagoons of the Philippines
Landforms of Cebu